A scald is a type of  burn injury caused by hot liquids or gases. It can also refer to:

Produce and drinks
 Scald (barley), common disease of barley in temperate regions
Apple scald, a disorder in the storage of apples
Pear scald, a disorder in the storage of pears
Scalded milk, milk heated to just below its boiling point

Computing and technology
 SCALD, structured computer-aided logic design system

Music

 Skáld (band)

See also
 Skald